Samy Khalid is a Canadian historian and herald who currently serves as Chief Herald of Canada.

Life and career 
Khalid began his career as a freelance translator before working as a political assistant in the Prime Minister's Office. He then worked for provincial cultural and public affairs organizations, including the Franco-Ontarian Heritage Consortium and the Francophone Assembly of Ontario.

In 2009, Khalid earned a doctorate in history from the University of Ottawa. He joined the Canadian Heraldic Authority in 2014, as Saguenay Herald, and became assistant director in an acting capacity in 2019. Khalid has also served as editor-in-chief of Le Chaînon since 2012.

On May 20, 2020, Khalid was appointed as Chief Herald of Canada.

On September 10, 2022, Khalid announced the proclamation of Charles III as King of Canada in a ceremony at Rideau Hall.

References 

Canadian officers of arms
Canadian Heraldic Authority
Chief Heralds of Canada
University of Ottawa alumni
Living people
Year of birth missing (living people)